Robert Stuart Fitzgerald (12 October 1910 – 16 January 1985) was an American poet, literary critic and translator whose renderings of the Greek classics "became standard works for a generation of scholars and students". He was best known as a translator of ancient Greek and Latin. He also composed several books of his own poetry.

Biography
Fitzgerald grew up in Springfield, Illinois, and graduated from The Choate School (now Choate Rosemary Hall) in Wallingford, Connecticut. He entered Harvard in 1929, and in 1931 a number of his poems were published in Poetry magazine. After graduating from Harvard in 1933 he became a reporter for The New York Herald Tribune for a year.

Later he worked several years for TIME magazine.   In 1940, William Saroyan lists him among "associate editors" at Time in the play, Love's Old Sweet Song. Whittaker Chambers mentions him as a colleague in his 1952 memoir, Witness.

In World War II, he served in the U.S. Navy in Guam and Pearl Harbor. Later he was an instructor at Sarah Lawrence and Princeton University, poetry editor of The New Republic. He succeeded Archibald MacLeish as Boylston Professor of Rhetoric and Oratory at Harvard in 1965 and served until his retirement in 1981.

He was a member of the American Academy of Arts and Sciences, and a Chancellor of the Academy of American Poets. From 1984 to 1985 he was appointed Consultant in Poetry to the Library of Congress, a position now known as Poet Laureate Consultant in Poetry, the United States' equivalent of a national poet laureate, but did not serve due to illness. In 1984 Fitzgerald received a L.H.D. from Bates College.

Fitzgerald is widely known as one of the most poetic translators into the English language. He also served as literary executor to Flannery O'Connor, who was a boarder at his home in Redding, Connecticut, from 1949 to 1951.  Fitzgerald's wife at the time, Sally Fitzgerald, compiled O'Connor's essays and letters after O'Connor's death. Benedict Fitzgerald (who co-wrote the screenplay for The Passion of the Christ with Mel Gibson), Barnaby Fitzgerald, and Michael Fitzgerald are sons of Robert and Sally.

Fitzgerald was married three times. He later moved to Hamden, Connecticut, where he died at his home after a long illness.

Bibliography

Translations

Poems

Editor

References

External links

 
 
 Interview from The Poet's Other Voice
 Robert Fitzgerald biography and example of poetry. Part of a series of poets.
Stuart A. Rose Manuscript, Archives, and Rare Book Library, Emory University: Sally Fitzgerald papers, circa 1930-2000
Robert Fitzgerald Papers. Yale Collection of American Literature, Beinecke Rare Book and Manuscript Library.

1910 births
1985 deaths
American Poets Laureate
American poets of Irish descent
American translators
Choate Rosemary Hall alumni
Harvard Advocate alumni
Greek–English translators
Latin–English translators
Writers from Springfield, Illinois
People from Ridgefield, Connecticut
20th-century American poets
20th-century translators
American male poets
Translators of Ancient Greek texts
People from Redding, Connecticut
20th-century American male writers
Translators of Homer
Translators of Virgil
Members of the American Academy of Arts and Letters